Or Blorian (born ) is an Israeli footballer who plays as a centre-back for Hapoel Be'er Sheva.

Early life
Blorian was born in Petah Tikva, Israel, to a Sephardic Jewish family.

Club career
Blorian made his professional debut for Maccabi Petah Tikva in the Liga Leumit on 22 August 2019, against Hapoel Nof HaGalil, which finished as a 3–2 home win.

Career statistics

References

External links
 
 
 

2000 births
Israeli Sephardi Jews
Living people
Israeli footballers
Association football central defenders
Maccabi Petah Tikva F.C. players
Hapoel Be'er Sheva F.C. players
Israeli Premier League players
Liga Leumit players
Footballers from Petah Tikva
Israel youth international footballers
Israel under-21 international footballers
Israeli people of Iranian-Jewish descent